The Ash Meadows National Wildlife Refuge is a protected wildlife refuge located in the Amargosa Valley of southern Nye County, in southwestern Nevada.

The refuge was created on June 18, 1984, to protect an extremely rare desert oasis in the Southwestern United States. It is administered by the U.S. Fish and Wildlife Service.

Geography

The  Ash Meadows National Wildlife Refuge is part of the larger Desert National Wildlife Refuge Complex, which also includes the Desert National Wildlife Refuge, the Moapa Valley National Wildlife Refuge, and the Pahranagat National Wildlife Refuge. Inside Ash Meadows is Devils Hole, a detached unit of Death Valley National Park.

Ash Meadows is within the Amargosa Desert, of the Mojave Desert ecoregion. The Amargosa River is a visible part of the valley hydrology, and has seasonal surface flow passing southwards adjacent to the preserve, to later enter Death Valley.

Natural history
Ash Meadows provides a valuable and unprecedented example of desert oases habitats, that have become extremely uncommon in the southwestern deserts. Water-bearing strata come to the surface in more than thirty seeps and springs, providing a rich, complex variety of mesic habitats.

Virtually all of the water at Ash Meadows is fossil water, believed to have entered the ground water system tens of thousands of years ago.

Numerous stream channels and wetlands are scattered throughout the refuge.  To the north and west are the remnants of Carson Slough, which was drained and mined for its peat in the 1960s. Sand dunes occur in the western and southern parts of the refuge.

Endemic plants and animals

Ash Meadows National Wildlife Refuge was established to provide and protect habitat for at least twenty-six endemic plants and animals, meaning they are found nowhere else in the world. Four fish and one plant are currently listed as endangered species.

The concentration of locally exclusive flora and fauna that distinguishes Ash Meadows is the greatest concentration of endemic biota in any local area within the United States. It has the second greatest local endemism concentration in all of North America.

Endemic flora
There are many plants endemic to Ash Meadows, including:

Ash Meadows sunray (Enceliopsis nudicaulis var. corrugata)
Ash Meadows blazingstar (Mentzelia leucophylla)
Ash Meadows gumplant (Grindelia fraxino-pratensis)
Ash Meadows milkvetch (Astragalus phoenix)
Amargosa niterwort (Nitrophila mohavensis)
Spring-loving centaury (Zeltnera namophila)

Discoveries
In 2010, Utah State University announced that a team from the school had discovered two new bee species in the genus Perdita at Ash Meadows.

References

External links 

 U.S. Fish and Wildlife Service: official Ash Meadows National Wildlife Refuge website
 U.S. Fish and Wildlife Service: Desert National Wildlife Refuge Complex website
 Worldwidepanorama.org: 360° interactive panoramic photo at Ash Meadows National Wildlife Refuge

Desert National Wildlife Refuge Complex
Amargosa Desert
National Wildlife Refuges in Nevada
Protected areas of Nye County, Nevada
Ramsar sites in the United States
Wetlands of Nevada
Protected areas established in 1984
1984 establishments in Nevada
Landforms of Nye County, Nevada
Meadows in the United States